Lucas Arnold Ker and Máximo González were the defending champions, but chose not to compete this year.Franco Ferreiro and Harsh Mankad won the final against Rameez Junaid and Philipp Marx 6–4, 3–6, [10–7].

Seeds

Main draw

Draw

References
Main Draw

Siemens Open - Doubles
2010 Doubles